UDP-xylose and UDP-N-acetylglucosamine transporter is a protein that in humans is encoded by the SLC35B4 gene.

See also
 Solute carrier family

References

Further reading

Solute carrier family